Noctis is Latin for "of night".

Noctis may also refer to:
 Noctis Labyrinthus, a region of Mars
 Noctis (video game), a 2000 space flight simulator
 Noctis Lucis Caelum, a character from the video game Final Fantasy XV
 Noctis Valkyries Metal Festival, a former Canadian music festival